Max Bockmühl (2 September 1882 – 5 January 1949) was a German inventor and chemist.

Life 
Bockmühl studied chemistry and pharmacy. He worked as chemist in Germany. Together with Gustav Ehrhart working for I.G. Farbenindustrie AG at the Farbwerke Hoechst, the pair developed Methadone in Germany, 1937, a drug synthesised from 1,1-diphenylbutane-2-sulfonic acid and dimethylamino-2-chloropropane, as they were looking for a synthetic opioid that could be created with readily available precursors, to solve Germany's opium shortage problem. Bockmühl was married.

References 

20th-century German inventors
20th-century German chemists
1882 births
1949 deaths
Scientists from Wuppertal